Alena Chadimová (born 22 November 1931) is a Czech former gymnast who competed for Czechoslovakia in the 1952 Summer Olympics. She was born in Olomouc.

References

External links
 
 

1931 births
Possibly living people
Sportspeople from Olomouc
Czech female artistic gymnasts
Olympic gymnasts of Czechoslovakia
Gymnasts at the 1952 Summer Olympics
Olympic bronze medalists for Czechoslovakia
Olympic medalists in gymnastics
Medalists at the 1952 Summer Olympics